Loshchinikha is a rural locality (a village) in Kharovskoye Rural Settlement, Kharovsky District, Vologda Oblast, Russia. Its population was 13 in 2002.

Geography 
Loshchinikha is 9 km northeast of Kharovsk (the district's administrative centre) by road. Ditinskaya is the nearest rural locality.

References 

Rural localities in Kharovsky District